Wolstein may refer to:

People 
Bert Wolstein (1927—2004), American real estate developer

Places 
Wolstein Center, American auditorium